Gfinity is an international esports company based in London, England. Founded in 2012, it develops and delivers esports experiences and strategies for game publishers, sports rights holders, commercial partners and media companies. Partnerships have included Formula One, the Premier League, Microsoft, Activision Blizzard, Amazon.com, BT Sport and Sky. The company is listed on the London Stock Exchange's Alternative Investment Market.

Alongside its esports business, Gfinity launched Gfinity Digital Media (GDM) in 2020, which comprises six websites focused on gaming and technology news and features. The Gfinity community has been built over time through online tournaments, professional events and its owned competition platform, the Gfinity Elite Series, which was broadcast through linear and digital channels until 2019. The company launched its first subscription service, Gfinity Plus, in July 2020.

History
Gfinity was founded in 2012 and merged with online league and tournament platform the Warped Gaming League (WGL) in 2013. The company held its first event G1 in July 2013, followed by G2 in October and G3 in August 2014, which included $30,000 Call of Duty, $7,500 FIFA and $15,000 StarCraft tournaments. In February 2015, Gfinity hosted the Call of Duty European Championships at London's Royal Opera House. The following month, it partnered with cinema chain Vue to open the UK's first dedicated esports venue for the inaugural Gfinity Championships, which included tournaments for Hearthstone, FIFA and Counter-Strike: Global Offensive. The event, which included 23 weekly tournaments, attracted over 58 million viewers.

In 2016, Gfinity hosted the first Formula E Race Off, the Halo World Championship Tour, the Vainglory European Winter Championship, the Call of Duty World League Summer Masters, and many more tournaments. Also in May, the Battlefield 1 global reveal event took place at the Gfinity Arena, including the premiere of the game's official trailer. In 2017, it was announced that Gfinity had partnered with American cable television provider Medicom. Later that year, the company was chosen by Microsoft as the official tournament partner for the Forza Racing Championship. Recent partnerships include Formula One, the Premier League, Abu Dhabi Motorsport Management, Microsoft, Activision Blizzard, Amazon.com, BT Sport and the Sky Group.

In March 2020, Gfinity CEO Graham Wallace and executive chairman Garry Cook stepped down from their roles; they were replaced, respectively, by global brand officer John Clarke and the company's co-founder Neville Upton. The same month, the company was selected to operate the online qualifiers and playoffs for the inaugural ePremier League USA by NBC Sports. In April, Gfinity hosted the ePL Invitational tournament for Sky Sports, from which the prize fund was donated to the #PlayersTogether initiative to benefit the National Health Service. The tournament was viewed by over 150 million people across all channels. After signing a multi-year agreement to deliver the F1 Esports Series, Gfinity delivered eight virtual races during the 2020 Formula One season postponement.

In May 2020, Gfinity announced the creation of a new digital media group within the company, Gfinity Digital Media (GDM), headed up by Talal Musa. With its launch, GDM also revealed Gfinity Plus, a digital rewards programme that supports gamer forums and facilitates data collection, which launched in July.

Services

Community building
Utilising its own technological intellectual property and production processes, Gfinity creates and delivers virtual and online esports programmes and competitions for publishers, sports rights holders, brands and media organisations, including Activision and 2K Games.

Since April 2020, the company has delivered the Virtual Grand Prix series and the ePremier League Invitationals, delivering record-breaking figures during the cancellation of many sporting events amid the COVID-19 pandemic. The Virtual Grand Prix Series received 30 million views across TV and digital platforms during the lockdown period, whilst the ePremier League Invitational Tournament received over 150 million total video views. Gfinity also partnered with BT Sport to produce the BT Sports FIFA Challenge, and with Willow TV to deliver the eCricket Challenge, a series which saw professional cricketers competing against each other in the video game Cricket 19.

Joint ventures/partnerships
Gfinity also partners with organisations to deliver projects across creative, production, game operations, community building and commercial opportunities.

In June 2020, Gfinity agreed a five-year partnership with Abu Dhabi Motorsport Management. Together, the two companies created the Global Racing Series, of which the first product is the V10 R League. The new racing championship will feature some of the fastest professional simulation racing drivers with a roster of teams from digital motorsport.

Gfinity Digital Media
Gfinity's media arm operates and owns 10 gaming, hardware and entertainment-based websites: GfinityEsports.com, RealSport101.com (and the smaller international sites: RealGaming101.es, RealGaming101.pt and RealGaming101.me), StealthOptional.com, Epicstream.com, RacingGames.gg, MTGRocks.com and the latest addition Stockinformer.com / .uk. The sites are monetised through CPM (programmatic static and video advertising), CPA (affiliate sales and brand partnerships), site takeovers and social amplification. The company has partnerships in place with Venatus (for ad serving).

Gfinity Plus, which launched in July 2020, is a reward-based product used by the company to "gather data and pave the way for the company to offer online social tournament play".

References

External links
Official website
GfinityEsports.com

Esports organizations
Companies based in the City of London
British companies established in 2012
Companies listed on the Alternative Investment Market
2012 establishments in England